

Events
William Grocyn becomes prebendary of Lincoln Cathedral.

Works
Leon Battista Alberti - De Re Aedificatoria (first printed book on architecture)
Joseph Albo - Sefer ha-Ikkarim (posthumously published)
Sir Thomas Malory - Le Morte d'Arthur

Births
October 1 - Johannes Dantiscus, Polish poet and bishop (died 1548)
probable - Hanibal Lucić, Croatian poet and playwright (died 1553)

Deaths
October 27 - Rodolphus Agricola, humanist writer (born 1443)
date unknown - Diebold Schilling the Elder, chronicler

References

 
Literature
Literature by year